The 2015 election for mayor of Dhaka North City Corporation was held on 30 April 2015. A total of 16 candidates participated in the election. The result was a victory for the Awami League candidate Annisul Huq, who received a 135,037-vote majority. However, the results was rejected by main opposition candidate, Tabit Awal of the Bangladesh Nationalist Party. The candidates got neutral symbol on this election.

Candidates

Results 

|-
! style="background-color:#E9E9E9;text-align:left;" width=225|Party 
! style="background-color:#E9E9E9;text-align:right;" |Seats won
! style="background-color:#E9E9E9;text-align:right;" |Seats change
|-
| style="text-align:left;" |Bangladesh Awami League
| style="text-align:center;" | 21
| style="text-align:center;" |  
|-
|-
| style="text-align:left;" | Awami rebel  
| style="text-align:center;" | 11
| style="text-align:center;" | 
|-
| style="text-align:left;" |Bangladesh Nationalist Party
| style="text-align:center;" | 2
| style="text-align:center;" | 
|-
| style="text-align:left;" |Jatiya Party (Ershad)
| style="text-align:center;" | 1
| style="text-align:center;" | 
|-
| style="text-align:left;" |Independents
| style="text-align:center;" | 1
| style="text-align:center;" | 
|-
| colspan="3"|Source: Daily Ittefaq
|}

Mayoral election results

References 

2015 elections in Bangladesh
2015 in Bangladesh
Dhaka
Local elections in Bangladesh